The FIBA Americas League Final 4 is the final four format final championship stage of the Latin American top-tier level FIBA Americas League (Portuguese: FIBA Liga das Américas, Spanish: FIBA Liga de las Américas) professional club basketball competition. It culminates with the FIBA Americas League Grand Final. The first FIBA Americas League Final Four was held in 2008, in Mexicali, Mexico.

FIBA Americas League Final Fours and Grand Finals

By club

By country

FIBA Americas League Grand Finals MVPs

See also
FIBA Americas League
FIBA Americas League Awards

References

External links
FIBA Americas League 
FIBA Americas League 
FIBA Americas  
FIBA Liga Americas Twitter 
LatinBasket.com FIBA Americas League 
Liga de las Américas YouTube Channel 

Final Four